Caledonia F.C., also known as Caledonian F.C.  or Caleys was a U.S. soccer team from Detroit, Michigan which had a short period of national prominence in the early 1920s.

History
Caledonia F.C. played in various Michigan amateur leagues.  In 1916, it won the Michigan State Association Football League.   The team had its greatest success in the National Challenge Cup.  Beginning with a quarterfinal showing in 1917, Caledonia F.C.  went to the fourth round in 1920, the semifinals in 1921 and 1922 and the third round in 1924.

Honors
Michigan State Association Football League
 Champion (1): 1916

Michigan State Association Clan Campbell Trophy
 Runner Up (1): 1919

Michigan State Cup
 Champion (1): 1922
 Runner Up (2): 1921, 1923

References

Defunct soccer clubs in Michigan
Soccer clubs in Detroit